Brad, Bradford or Bradley Hill may refer to:
 Brad Hill (baseball coach) (born 1962), American baseball coach
 Bradford Hill (born 1967), American politician
 Brad Hill (basketball) (born 1986), Australian basketball player
 Brad Hill (athlete) (active 1988), Australian Paralympic athlete
 Brad Hill (producer) (born 1981), American record producer
 Bradley Hill (footballer) (born 1993), Australian rules footballer

See also 
 Bradford Dudley Hill, an English rugby league club based in Bradford, West Yorkshire
 Bradford Hill criteria, a group of minimal conditions necessary to provide adequate evidence of a causal relationship between an incidence and a consequence
 Bradley hill fort, an Iron Age hill fort in the county of Cheshire in northern England
 Bradley Hills Presbyterian Church, a Presbyterian Church in Bethesda, Maryland
 Buckshraft Mine & Bradley Hill Railway Tunnel, a Site of Special Scientific Interest in Gloucestershire, England
 Hill (surname)